Flight 121 may refer to:

Mohawk Airlines Flight 121, crashed on 2 July 1963 during takeoff in Rochester, New York
Pan Am Flight 121, suffered an engine failure and crashed on 18 June 1947 in Mayadine, Syria
South Pacific Airlines Flight 121, a fictional flight in Snakes on a Plane

0121